Emor ( — Hebrew for "speak," the fifth word, and the first distinctive word, in the parashah) is the 31st weekly Torah portion (parashah) in the annual Jewish cycle of Torah reading and the eighth in the Book of Leviticus. The parashah describes purity rules for priests (Kohanim), recounts the holy days, describes the preparations for the lights and bread in the sanctuary, and tells the story of a blasphemer and his punishment. The parashah constitutes . It has the most verses (but not the most letters or words) of any of the weekly Torah portions in the Book of Leviticus, and is made up of 6,106 Hebrew letters, 1,614 Hebrew words, 124 verses and 215 lines in a Torah Scroll (Sefer Torah). (Parashah Vayikra has the most letters and words of any weekly Torah portion in Leviticus.)

Jews generally read it in early May, or rarely in late April. Jews also read parts of the parashah, as the initial Torah readings for the second day of Passover and the first and second days of Sukkot.

Readings

First reading — Leviticus 21:1–15
In the first reading (aliyah), God told Moses to tell the priests the priestly laws. None were to come in contact with a dead body except for that of his closest relatives: his parent, child, brother, or virgin sister. They were not to shave any part of their heads or the side-growth of their beards or gash their flesh. They were not to marry a harlot or divorcee. The daughter of a priest who became a harlot was to be executed. The High Priest was not to bare his head or rend his vestments. He was not to come near any dead body, even that of his father or mother. He was to marry only a virgin of his own kin.

Second reading — Leviticus 21:16–22:16
In the second reading (aliyah), no disabled priest could offer sacrifices. He could eat the meat of sacrifices, but could not come near the altar. No priest who had become unclean could eat the meat of sacrifices. A priest could not share his sacrificial meat with lay persons, persons whom the priest had hired, or the priest's married daughters. However, the priest could share that meat with his slaves and widowed or divorced daughters, if those daughters had no children.

Third reading — Leviticus 22:17–33
In the third reading (aliyah), only animals without defect qualified for sacrifice.

Fourth reading — Leviticus 23:1–22
In the fourth reading (aliyah), God told Moses to instruct the Israelites to proclaim the following sacred occasions:
Shabbat (Sabbath) on the seventh day, a day on which no servile work was to be undertaken 
Pesach (Passover) for 7 days beginning at twilight of the 14th day of the first month
Shavuot (Feast of Weeks) 50 days later

Fifth reading — Leviticus 23:23–32
The fifth reading (aliyah) continues the sacred occasions:
Rosh Hashanah (New Year) on the first day of the seventh month
Yom Kippur (Day of Atonement) on the 10th day of the seventh month

Sixth reading — Leviticus 23:33–44
The sixth reading (aliyah), concludes the sacred occasions:
Sukkot (Tabernacles) for 8 days beginning on the 15th day of the seventh month

Seventh reading — Leviticus 24:1–23
In the seventh reading (aliyah), God told Moses to command the Israelites to bring clear olive oil for lighting the lamps of the Tabernacle regularly, from evening to morning. And God called for baking twelve loaves to be placed in the Tabernacle every Sabbath, and thereafter given to the priests, who were to eat them in the sacred precinct.

A man with an Israelite mother (from the tribe of Dan) and an Egyptian father got in a fight, and pronounced God's Name in blasphemy. The people brought him to Moses and placed him in custody until God's decision should be made clear. God told Moses to take the blasphemer outside the camp where all who heard him were to lay their hands upon his head, and the whole community was to stone him, and they did so. God instructed that anyone who blasphemed God was to be put to death. Anyone who murdered any human being was to be put to death. One who killed a beast was to make restitution. And anyone who maimed another person was to pay proportionately (in what has been called lex talionis).

Readings according to the triennial cycle
Jews who read the Torah according to the triennial cycle of Torah reading read the parashah according to the following schedule:

In ancient parallels
The parashah has parallels in these ancient sources:

Leviticus chapter 24
The Code of Hammurabi provided that if a man destroyed the eye of another man, they were to destroy his eye. If one broke a man's bone, they were to break his bone. If one destroyed the eye of a commoner or broke the bone of a commoner, he was to pay one mina of silver. If one destroyed the eye of a slave or broke a bone of a slave, he was to pay one-half the slave's price. If a man knocked out a tooth of a man of his own rank, they were to knock out his tooth. If one knocked out a tooth of a commoner, he was to pay one-third of a mina of silver. If a man struck a man's daughter and brought about a miscarriage, he was to pay 10 shekels of silver for her miscarriage. If the woman died, they were to put the man's daughter to death. If a man struck the daughter of a commoner and brought about a miscarriage, he was to pay five shekels of silver. If the woman died, he was to pay one-half of a mina of silver. If he struck a man's female slave and brought about a miscarriage, he was to pay two shekels of silver. If the female slave died, he was to pay one-third of a mina of silver.

In inner-Biblical interpretation
The parashah has parallels or is discussed in these Biblical sources:

Leviticus chapter 21

Corpse contamination
In , God instructed Moses to direct the priests not to allow themselves to become defiled by contact with the dead, except for a mother, father, son, daughter, brother, or unmarried sister. And the priests were not to engage in mourning rituals of making baldness upon their heads, shaving off the corners of their beards, or cutting their flesh. This prohibition of corpse contamination is one of a series of passages in the Hebrew Bible setting out the teaching that contact with the dead is antithetical to purity.

In , God instructed Moses to command the Israelites to put out of the camp every person defiled by contact with the dead, so that they would not defile their camps, in the midst of which God dwelt.

 sets out a procedure for a red cow mixture for decontamination from corpse contamination.

 instructed Israelites to announce before God that they had not eaten from the tithe in mourning, nor put away any of it while unclean, nor given any of it to the dead.

In , the prophet Ezekiel cites the burial of kings within the Temple as one of the practices that defiled the Temple and cause God to abandon it.

In the Hebrew Bible, uncleanness has a variety of associations. And perhaps similarly,  associates it with skin disease.  associates it with childbirth.  associates it with various sexuality-related events.

Leviticus chapter 22
The prophet asked whether such presents would please an earthly governor.

Leviticus chapter 23

The Sabbath
 refers to the Sabbath. Commentators note that the Hebrew Bible repeats the commandment to observe the Sabbath 12 times.

 reports that on the seventh day of Creation, God finished God's work, rested, and blessed and hallowed the seventh day.

The Sabbath is one of the Ten Commandments.  commands that one remember the Sabbath day, keep it holy, and not do any manner of work or cause anyone under one's control to work, for in six days God made heaven and earth and rested on the seventh day, blessed the Sabbath, and hallowed it.  commands that one observe the Sabbath day, keep it holy, and not do any manner of work or cause anyone under one's control to work — so that one's subordinates might also rest — and remember that the Israelites were servants in the land of Egypt, and God brought them out with a mighty hand and by an outstretched arm.

And God told Moses to let no one go out of one's place on the seventh day.

In , just before giving Moses the second Tablets of Stone, God commanded that the Israelites keep and observe the Sabbath throughout their generations, as a sign between God and the children of Israel forever, for in six days God made heaven and earth, and on the seventh day God rested.

In , just before issuing the instructions for the Tabernacle, Moses again told the Israelites that no one should work on the Sabbath, specifying that one must not kindle fire on the Sabbath.

In , God told Moses to repeat the Sabbath commandment to the people, calling the Sabbath a holy convocation.

The prophet Isaiah taught in  that iniquity is inconsistent with the Sabbath. In , the prophet taught that if people turn away from pursuing or speaking of business on the Sabbath and call the Sabbath a delight, then God will make themride upon the high places of the earth and will feed them with the heritage of Jacob.

The prophet Jeremiah taught in  that the fate of Jerusalem depended on whether the people obstained from work on the Sabbath, refraining from carrying burdens outside their houses and through the city gates.

The prophet Ezekiel told in  how God gave the Israelites God's Sabbaths, to be a sign between God and them, but the Israelites rebelled against God by profaning the Sabbaths, provoking God to pour out God's fury upon them, but God stayed God's hand.

In , Nehemiah told how he saw some treading winepresses on the Sabbath, and others bringing all manner of burdens into Jerusalem on the Sabbath day, so when it began to be dark before the Sabbath, he commanded that the city gates be shut and not opened till after the Sabbath and directed the Levites to keep the gates to sanctify the Sabbath.

Passover

 refers to the Festival of Passover. In the Hebrew Bible, Passover is called:
Passover (Pesach);
The Feast of Unleavened Bread (Chag haMatzot); and
A holy convocation or a solemn assembly.

Some explain the double nomenclature of "Passover" and "Feast of Unleavened Bread" as referring to two separate feasts that the Israelites combined sometime between the Exodus and when the Biblical text became settled.  and  indicate that the dedication of the firstborn also became associated with the festival.

Some believe that the Feast of Unleavened Bread was an agricultural festival at which the Israelites celebrated the beginning of the grain harvest.

"Passover," on the other hand, was associated with a thanksgiving sacrifice of a lamb, also called "the Passover," "the Passover lamb," or "the Passover offering."

Some believe that the propinquity of the dates of the two festivals led to their confusion and merger.

 and 27 link the word "Passover" (Pesach) to God's act to "pass over" (pasach) the Israelites' houses in the plague of the firstborn. In the Torah, the consolidated Passover and Feast of Unleavened Bread thus commemorate the Israelites' liberation from Egypt.

The Hebrew Bible frequently notes the Israelites' observance of Passover at turning points in their history.  reports God's direction to the Israelites to observe Passover in the wilderness of Sinai on the anniversary of their liberation from Egypt.  reports that upon entering the Promised Land, the Israelites kept the Passover on the plains of Jericho and ate unleavened cakes and parched corn, produce of the land, the next day.  reports that King Josiah commanded the Israelites to keep the Passover in Jerusalem as part of Josiah's reforms, but also notes that the Israelites had not kept such a Passover from the days of the Biblical judges nor in all the days of the kings of Israel or the kings of Judah, calling into question the observance of even Kings David and Solomon. The more reverent , however, reports that Solomon offered sacrifices on the festivals, including the Feast of Unleavened Bread. And  reports King Hezekiah's observance of a second Passover anew, as sufficient numbers of neither the priests nor the people were prepared to do so before then. And  reports that the Israelites returned from the Babylonian captivity observed Passover, ate the Passover lamb, and kept the Feast of Unleavened Bread seven days with joy.

Shavuot
 refers to the Festival of Shavuot. In the Hebrew Bible, Shavuot is called:
The Feast of Weeks (Chag Shavuot);
The Day of the First-fruits (Yom haBikurim);
The Feast of Harvest (Chag haKatzir); and
A holy convocation.

 associates Shavuot with the first-fruits of the wheat harvest. In turn,  set out the ceremony for the bringing of the first fruits.

To arrive at the correct date,  instructs counting seven weeks from the day after the day of rest of Passover, the day that they brought the sheaf of barley for waving. Similarly,  directs counting seven weeks from when they first put the sickle to the standing barley.

 sets out a course of offerings for the fiftieth day, including a meal-offering of two loaves made from fine flour from the first-fruits of the harvest; burnt-offerings of seven lambs, one bullock, and two rams; a sin-offering of a goat; and a peace-offering of two lambs. Similarly,  sets out a course of offerings including a meal-offering; burnt-offerings of two bullocks, one ram, and seven lambs; and one goat to make atonement.  directs a freewill-offering in relation to God's blessing.

 and  ordain a holy convocation in which the Israelites were not to work.

 reports that Solomon offered burnt-offerings on the Feast of Weeks.

Rosh Hashanah
 refers to the Festival of Rosh Hashanah. In the Hebrew Bible, Rosh Hashanah is called:
a memorial proclaimed with the blast of horns (Zichron Teruah);
a day of blowing the horn (Yom Teruah); and
a holy convocation

Although  instructs that the spring month of Aviv (since the Babylonian captivity called Nisan) "shall be the first month of the year,"  and  also reflect an "end of the year" or a "turn of the year" in the autumn harvest month of Tishrei.

 and  both describe Rosh Hashanah as an holy convocation, a day of solemn rest in which no servile work is to be done, involving the blowing of horns and an offering to God.

 speaks of "in the beginning of the year" (b'Rosh HaShanah) in Tishrei, although the Rabbis traditionally interpreted Ezekiel to refer to Yom Kippur.

 reports that in the Persian era, when the seventh month came, the Israelites gathered together in Jerusalem, and the priests offered burnt-offerings to God, morning and evening, as written in the Law of Moses.

 reports that it was on Rosh Hashanah (the first day of the seventh month) that all the Israelites gathered together before the water gate and Ezra the scribe read the Law from early morning until midday. And Nehemiah, Ezra, and the Levites told the people that the day was holy to the Lord their God; they should neither mourn nor weep; but they should go their way, eat the fat, drink the sweet, and send portions to those who had nothing.

Psalm  likely refers to Rosh Hashanah when it enjoins, "Blow the horn at the new moon, at the full moon of our feast day. For it is a statute for Israel, an ordinance of the God of Jacob."

Yom Kippur
 refers to the Festival of Yom Kippur. In the Hebrew Bible, Yom Kippur is called:
the Day of Atonement (Yom HaKippurim) or a Day of Atonement (Yom Kippurim);
a Sabbath of solemn rest (Shabbat Shabbaton); and
a holy convocation.

Much as Yom Kippur, on the 10th of the month of Tishrei, precedes the Festival of Sukkot, on the 15th of the month of Tishrei,  speaks of a period starting on the 10th of the month of Nisan preparatory to the Festival of Passover, on the 15th of the month of Nisan.

Similarly,  and  call it a "Sabbath of solemn rest." And  and  institute the observance as "a statute forever."

 sets out detailed procedures for the priest's atonement ritual.

 instructs that after seven Sabbatical years, on the Jubilee year, on the day of atonement, the Israelites were to proclaim liberty throughout the land with the blast of the horn and return every man to his possession and to his family.

In , the Haftarah for Yom Kippur morning, God describes "the fast that I have chosen [on] the day for a man to afflict his soul."  make clear that "to afflict the soul" was understood as fasting.

Sukkot
And  refers to the Festival of Sukkot. In the Hebrew Bible, Sukkot is called:
The Feast of Tabernacles (or Booths);
The Feast of Ingathering;
The Feast or the festival;
The Feast of the Lord;
The festival of the seventh month; and
A holy convocation or a sacred occasion..

Sukkot's agricultural origin is evident from the name The Feast of Ingathering, from the ceremonies accompanying it, and from the season and occasion of its celebration: "At the end of the year when you gather in your labors out of the field"; "after you have gathered in from your threshing-floor and from your winepress." It was a thanksgiving for the fruit harvest. And in what may explain the festival's name, Isaiah reports that grape harvesters kept booths in their vineyards. Coming as it did at the completion of the harvest, Sukkot was regarded as a general thanksgiving for the bounty of nature in the year that had passed.

Sukkot became one of the most important feasts in Judaism, as indicated by its designation as the Feast of the Lord or simply "the Feast." Perhaps because of its wide attendance, Sukkot became the appropriate time for important state ceremonies. Moses instructed the children of Israel to gather for a reading of the Law during Sukkot every seventh year. King Solomon dedicated the Temple in Jerusalem on Sukkot. And Sukkot was the first sacred occasion observed after the resumption of sacrifices in Jerusalem after the Babylonian captivity.

In the time of Nehemiah, after the Babylonian captivity, the Israelites celebrated Sukkot by making and dwelling in booths, a practice of which Nehemiah reports: "the Israelites had not done so from the days of Joshua." In a practice related to that of the Four Species, Nehemiah also reports that the Israelites found in the Law the commandment that they "go out to the mountains and bring leafy branches of olive trees, pine trees, myrtles, palms and [other] leafy trees to make booths." In , God told Moses to command the people: "On the first day you shall take the product of  trees, branches of palm trees, boughs of leafy trees, and willows of the brook," and "You shall live in booths seven days; all citizens in Israel shall live in booths, in order that future generations may know that I made the Israelite people live in booths when I brought them out of the land of Egypt." The book of Numbers, however, indicates that while in the wilderness, the Israelites dwelt in tents. Some secular scholars consider  (the commandments regarding booths and the four species) to be an insertion by a late redactor.

Jeroboam son of Nebat, King of the northern Kingdom of Israel, whom  describes as practicing "his evil way," celebrated a festival on the fifteenth day of the eighth month, one month after Sukkot, "in imitation of the festival in Judah." "While Jeroboam was standing on the altar to present the offering, the man of God, at the command of the Lord, cried out against the altar" in disapproval.

According to the prophet Zechariah, in the messianic era, Sukkot will become a universal festival, and all nations will make pilgrimages annually to Jerusalem to celebrate the feast there.

Leviticus chapter 24
In three separate places — ; ; and  — the Torah sets forth the law of "an eye for an eye."

In early nonrabbinic interpretation
The parashah has parallels or is discussed in these early nonrabbinic sources:

Leviticus chapter 23
 told how in the 2nd century BCE, many followers of the pious Jewish priest Mattathias rebelled against the Seleucid king Antiochus IV Epiphanes.  Antiochus's soldiers attacked a group of them on the Sabbath, and when the Pietists failed to defend themselves so as to honor the Sabbath (commanded in, among other places), a thousand died.   reported that when Mattathias and his friends heard, they reasoned that if they did not fight on the Sabbath, they would soon be destroyed.  So they decided that they would fight against anyone who attacked them on the Sabbath.

A letter from Simon bar Kokhba written during the Bar Kokhba revolt found in the Cave of Letters includes commands to a subordinate to assemble components of the lulav and etrog, apparently so as to celebrate Sukkot.

In classical rabbinic interpretation
The parashah is discussed in these rabbinic sources from the era of the Mishnah and the Talmud:

Leviticus chapter 21
Rabbi Tanhum taught that they were given on account of the tribe of Levi, of whom it is written (in ), "he [God's messenger] shall purify the sons of Levi and purge them."

The Gemara reported that Rabbi Johanan interpreted , "Take this book of the law," to refer to the time after the Torah had been joined together from its several parts. And the Gemara suggested that Resh Lakish interpreted , "in a roll of the book written of me," to indicate that the whole Torah is called a "roll," as  says, "And he said to me, 'What do you see?' And I answered, 'I see a flying roll.'" Or perhaps, the Gemara suggested, it is called "roll" for the reason given by Rabbi Levi, who said that God gave eight sections of the Torah, which Moses then wrote on separate rolls, on the day on which the Tabernacle was set up.

But then the Gemara stated that the correct interpretation was that the language meant to warn adults to avoid contaminating the children through their own contact. Elsewhere, the Gemara used the redundancy to teach that a priest could also defile himself by contact with the greater part of the bodily frame of his sister's corpse or the majority of its bones. A Midrash explained the redundancy by teaching that the first expression of "speak" indicated that a priest may defile himself on account of an unattended corpse (meit mitzvah), while the second expression "say" indicated that he may not defile himself on account of any other corpse. Another Midrash explained the redundancy to teach that for the celestial beings, where the Evil Inclination (yeitzer hara) is non-existent, one utterance is sufficient, but with terrestrial beings, in whom the Evil Inclination exists, at least two utterances are required.

The other exceptions are the commandments of  not to round off the side-growth of one's head and not to destroy the corners of one's beard (which likewise apply only to men).

One could (1) plow with an ox and a donkey yoked together (in violation of ) (2 and 3) that are two animals dedicated to the sanctuary, (4) plowing mixed seeds sown in a vineyard (in violation of ), (5) during a Sabbatical year (in violation of ), (6) on a Festival-day (in violation of, for example), (7) when the plower is a priest (in violation of ) and (8) a Nazirite (in violation of ) plowing in a contaminated place. They said to him that this would not be in the same category as the other violations. He replied that neither is the Nazirite in the same category as the other violations.

The Gemara taught that where  prohibited the priest from defiling himself by contact with the dead "except for his flesh, that is near to him" the words "his flesh" meant to include his wife in the exception.

Reading , "And for his sister a virgin, that is near to him, who has had no husband, for her may he become impure," Rabbi Ishmael taught that it was optional for a priest to participate in his sister's burial. But Rabbi Akiva said that it was mandatory for him to do so.

The Babylonian Talmud reported that the Sages taught that a mourner must mourn for all the relatives for whom  teaches that a priest became impure — his wife, father, mother, son, daughter, and brother and unmarried sister from the same father. The Sages added to this list his brother and unmarried sister from the same mother, and his married sister, whether from the same father or from the same mother.

The Mishnah interpreted  to teach that both acting and retired High Priests had to marry a virgin and were forbidden to marry a widow. And the Mishnah interpreted  to teach that both could not defile themselves for the dead bodies of their relatives, could not let their hair grow wild in mourning, and could not rend their clothes as other Jews did in mourning. The Mishnah taught that while an ordinary priest in mourning rent his garments from above, a High Priest rent his garments from below. And the Mishnah taught that on the day of a close relative's death, the High Priest could still offer sacrifices but could not eat of the sacrificial meat, while under those circumstances an ordinary priest could neither offer sacrifices nor eat sacrificial meat.

Rabbi Hiyya bar Abba cited  to support the proposition that a Kohen should be called up first to read the law, for the verse taught to give Kohanim precedence in every matter of sanctity. And a Baraita was taught in the school of Rabbi Ishmael that  meant that Jews should give Kohanim precedence in every matter of sanctity, including speaking first at every assembly, saying grace first, and choosing his portion first when an item was to be divided. The Mishnah recognized the status of the Kohanim over Levites, Levites over Israelites, and Israelites over those born from forbidden relationships, but only when they were equal in all other respects. The Mishnah taught that a learned child of forbidden parents took precedence over an ignorant High Priest.

And the Sifre reasoned that just as the High Priest was required nonetheless to become unclean to see to the burial of a neglected corpse (met mitzvah), so too was the nazirite required to become unclean to see to the burial of a neglected corpse.

The Mishnah taught that a disability that did not disqualify priests disqualified Levites, and a disability that did not disqualify Levites disqualified priests. The Gemara explained that our Rabbis taught that  disqualified priests by reason of a bodily blemish, and not by reason of age; and Levites were disqualified by age, for they were qualified for service only from the age of 30 to 50, and not by bodily blemish. It follows, therefore, that the disability that does not disqualify priests disqualifies Levites, and the disability that does not disqualify Levites disqualifies priests. The Gemara taught that we know this from a Baraita in which our Rabbis noted that  says: "This is that which pertains to the Levites." From , "And from the age of 50 years they shall return from the service of the work," we know that Levites were disqualified by age. One might have argued that they were disqualified by bodily blemish too; thus, if priests who were not disqualified by age were nevertheless disqualified by bodily blemish, Levites who were disqualified by age should surely have been disqualified by bodily blemish.  therefore says: "This is that which pertains to the Levites," to instruct that "this", that is, age, only disqualifies Levites, but nothing else disqualifies them. One might also have argued that priests were disqualified by age too; thus, if Levites who were not disqualified by bodily blemish were nevertheless disqualified by age, priests who were disqualified by bodily blemish should surely have been disqualified by age.  therefore says: "Which pertains to the Levites", and not "to the priests". One might further have supposed that the rule that Levites were disqualified by age obtained even at Shiloh and at the Temple at Jerusalem, where the Levites sang in the choir and guarded the doors of the Temple.  therefore says: "To do the work of service and the work of bearing burdens," to instruct that God ordained this rule disqualifying Levites by age only when the work was that of bearing burdens upon the shoulder, the service of the Tabernacle in the wilderness, and not at the Temple at Jerusalem. Similarly, the Sifre taught that years invalidated in the case of Levites but not in the case of the priesthood. For prior to the entry into the Land of Israel, the Levites were valid from the age of 30 to the age of 50, while the priests were valid from puberty until the end of their lives. But once they came into the Land, the Levites were invalidated only by losing their voice. Elsewhere, the Sifre read , "and shall serve no more; but shall minister with their brethren in the tent of meeting, to keep the charge, but they shall do no manner of service," to teach that the Levite went back to the work of locking the doors and carrying out the tasks assigned to the sons of Gershom.

Rabbi said that a priest with a blemish within the meaning of  who officiated at services in the Sanctuary was liable to death at the hands of Heaven, but the Sages maintained that he was merely prohibited.

The Mishnah taught that a priest whose hands were deformed should not lift up his hands to say the priestly blessing, and Rabbi Judah said that a priest whose hands were discolored should not lift up his hands, because it would cause the congregation to look at him during this blessing when they should not. A Baraita stated that deformities on the face, hands, or feet were disqualifying for saying the priestly blessing. Rabbi Joshua ben Levi said that a Kohen with spotted hands should not say the blessing. A Baraita taught that one whose hands were curved inwards or bent sideways should not say the blessing. And Rav Huna said that a man whose eyes ran should not say the blessing. But the Gemara noted that such a Kohen in Rav Huna's neighborhood used to say the priestly blessing and apparently even Rav Huna did not object, because the townspeople had become accustomed to the Kohen. And the Gemara cited a Baraita that taught that a man whose eyes ran should not lift up his hands, but he was permitted to do so if the townspeople were accustomed to him. Rabbi Johanan said that a man blind in one eye should not lift up his hands. But the Gemara noted that there was one in Rabbi Johanan's neighborhood who used to lift up his hands, as the townspeople were accustomed to him. And the Gemara cited a Baraita that taught that a man blind in one eye should not lift up his hands, but if the townspeople were accustomed to him, he was permitted. Rabbi Judah said that a man whose hands were discolored should not lift up his hands, but the Gemara cited a Baraita that taught that if most of the men of the town follow the same hand-discoloring occupation, it was permitted.

Rav Ashi deduced from  that arrogance constitutes a blemish.

Leviticus chapter 22

And a freewill-offering was when one said, "This animal shall serve as a burnt-offering" (specifying a particular animal). In the case of vow offerings, one was responsible for replacement of the animal if the animal died or was stolen; but in the case of freewill obligations, one was not held responsible for the animal's replacement if the specified animal died or was stolen.

With regard to idolatry, the Gemara asked whether one could commit it to save one's life, as it was taught in a Baraita that Rabbi Ishmael said that if a person is directed to engage in idolatry in order to avoid being killed, the person should do so, and stay alive. From this, one might think that a person could openly engage in idolatry in order to avoid being killed, but this is not so, as  teaches, "Neither shall you profane My holy Name; but I will be hallowed". When Rav Dimi came from the Land of Israel to Babylonia, he taught that the rule that one may violate any commandment except idolatry, prohibited sexual relations, and murder to stay alive applied only when there is no royal decree forbidding the practice of Judaism. But Rav Dimi taught that if there is such a decree, one must incur martyrdom rather than transgress even a minor precept. When Ravin came, he said in Rabbi Johanan's name that even absent such a decree, one was allowed to violate a commandment to stay alive only in private; but in public one needed to be martyred rather than violate even a minor precept. Rava bar Rav Isaac said in Rav's name that in this context one should choose martyrdom rather than violate a commandment even to change a shoe strap. Rabbi Jacob said in Rabbi Johanan's name that the minimum number of people for an act to be considered public is ten. And the Gemara taught that ten Jews are required for the event to be public, for  says, "I will be hallowed among the children of Israel".

Rav said that it would profane God's Name if a Torah scholar took meat from a butcher without paying promptly. Abaye said that this would profane God's Name only in a place where vendors did not have a custom of going out to collect payment from their customers. Rabbi Johanan said that it would profane God's Name if a Torah scholar walked six feet without either contemplating Torah or wearing tefillin. Isaac of the School of Rabbi Jannai said that it would profane God's Name if one's bad reputation caused colleagues to become ashamed. Rav Nahman bar Isaac said that an example of this would be where people called on God to forgive so-and-so. So that if people see that those who study Torah and Mishnah are honest in business and speak pleasantly, then they will accord honor to the Name of God. But if people see that those who study Torah and Mishnah are dishonest in business and discourteous, then they will associate their shortcomings with their being Torah scholars.

The Tosefta taught that one who robs from a non-Jew must restore what one stole, and the rule applies more strictly when robbing a non-Jew than when robbing a Jew because of the profanation of God's Name (in violation of ) involved in robbing a non-Jew.

Leviticus chapter 23

The Mishnah taught that every act that violates the law of the Sabbath also violates the law of a festival, except that one may prepare food on a festival but not on the Sabbath.

A Midrash asked to which commandment  refers when it says, "For if you shall diligently keep all this commandment that I command you, to do it, to love the Lord your God, to walk in all His ways, and to cleave to Him, then will the Lord drive out all these nations from before you, and you shall dispossess nations greater and mightier than yourselves." Rabbi Levi said that "this commandment" refers to the recitation of the Shema, but the Rabbis said that it refers to the Sabbath, which is equal to all the precepts of the Torah.

The Alphabet of Rabbi Akiva taught that when God was giving Israel the Torah, God told them that if they accepted the Torah and observed God's commandments, then God would give them for eternity a most precious thing that God possessed — the World To Come. When Israel asked to see in this world an example of the World To Come, God replied that the Sabbath is an example of the World To Come.

Rabbi Akiva (or some say Rabban Johanan ben Zakai) never said in the house of study that it was time to stop studying, except on the eve of Passover and the eve of the Yom Kippur. On the eve of Passover, it was because of the children, so that they might not fall asleep, and on the eve of the Day of Atonement, it was so that they should feed their children before the fast.

The Mishnah taught that a Passover sacrifice was disqualified if it was slaughtered for people who were not qualified to eat it, such as uncircumcised men or people in a state of impurity. But it was fit if it was slaughtered for people who able to eat it and people who were not able to eat it, or for people who were designated for it and people who were not designated for it, or for men circumcised and men uncircumcised, or for people in a state of impurity and people in a state of purity. It was disqualified if it was slaughtered before noon, as  says, "Between the evenings." It was fit if it was slaughtered before the daily offering of the afternoon, but only if someone had been stirring the blood until the blood of the daily offering had been sprinkled. And if that blood had already been sprinkled, the Passover sacrifice was still fit.

The Mishnah taught that the prohibitions of  that "seven days shall there be no leaven found in your houses" and of  that "no leaven shall be seen in all your territory" applied to the first Passover; while at the second Passover, one could have both leavened and unleavened bread in one's house. And the Mishnah taught that for the first Passover, one was required to recite the Hallel when the Passover lamb was eaten; while the second Passover did not require the reciting of Hallel when the Passover lamb was eaten. But both the first and second Passovers required the reciting of Hallel when the Passover lambs were offered, and both Passover lambs were eaten roasted with unleavened bread and bitter herbs. And both the first and second Passovers took precedence over the Sabbath.

Rabbi Abba distinguished the bull and single ram that  required Aaron to bring for the Inauguration of the Tabernacle from the bull and two rams that  required the High Priest to bring on Shavuot, and thus the Gemara concluded that one cannot reason by analogy from the requirements for the Inauguration to those of Shavuot.

And for those who do not give to the poor, it is accounted to them as if the Temple existed and they did not offer up their sacrifices in it.

The Mishnah taught that the Torah defines no minimum or maximum for the donation of the corners of one's field to the poor. But the Mishnah also taught that one should not make the amount left to the poor less than one-sixtieth of the entire crop. And even though no definite amount is given, the amount given should accord with the size of the field, the number of poor people, and the extent of the yield.

Rabbi Eliezer taught that one who cultivates land in which one can plant a quarter kav of seed is obligated to give a corner to the poor. Rabbi Joshua said land that yields two seah of grain. Rabbi Tarfon said land of at least six handbreadths by six handbreadths. Rabbi Judah ben Betera said land that requires two strokes of a sickle to harvest, and the law is as he spoke. Rabbi Akiva said that one who cultivates land of any size is obligated to give a corner to the poor and the first fruits.

The Mishnah taught that the poor could enter a field to collect three times a day — in the morning, at midday, and in the afternoon. Rabban Gamliel taught that they said this only so that landowners should not reduce the number of times that the poor could enter. Rabbi Akiva taught that they said this only so that landowners should not increase the number of times that the poor had to enter. The landowners of Beit Namer used to harvest along a rope and allowed the poor to collect a corner from every row.

Reading , the Gemara noted that a Baraita (Tosefta Peah 1:5) taught that the optimal way to fulfill the commandment is for the owner to separate the portion for the poor from grain that has not been harvested. If the owner did not separate it from the standing grain, the owner separates it from the sheaves of grain that have been harvested. If the owner did not separate it from the sheaves, the owner separates it from the pile of grain, as long as the owner has not yet smoothed the pile. Once the owner smooths the pile of grain, it becomes obligated in tithes. Therefore, the owner must first tithe the grain and then give a portion of the produce to the poor, so that the poor need not tithe what they receive. The Sages said in the name of Rabbi Ishmael that if the owner did not separate the portion for the poor during any of these stages, and the owner milled the grain and kneaded it into dough, the owner still needed to separate a portion even from the dough and give it to the poor. Even if the owner has harvested the grain, the portion for the poor is still not considered the owner's possession.

The Gemara noted that  includes a superfluous term "by reaping" and reasoned that this must teach that the obligation to leave for the poor applies to crops that the owner uproots as well as to crops that the owner cuts. And the Gemara reasoned that the superfluous words "When you reap" in  teach that the obligation also extends to one who picks a crop by hand.

The Mishnah taught that Divine judgment is passed on the world at four seasons (based on the world's actions in the preceding year) — at Passover for produce; at Shavuot for fruit; at Rosh Hashanah all creatures pass before God like children of maron (one by one), as  says, "He Who fashions the heart of them all, Who considers all their doings." And on Sukkot, judgment is passed in regard to rain.

Rabbi Meir taught that all are judged on Rosh Hashanah and the decree is sealed on Yom Kippur. Rabbi Judah, however, taught that all are judged on Rosh Hashanah and the decree of each and every one of them is sealed in its own time — at Passover for grain, at Shavuot for fruits of the orchard, at Sukkot for water. And the decree of humankind is sealed on Yom Kippur. Rabbi Jose taught that humankind is judged every single day, as  says, "What is man, that You should magnify him, and that You should set Your heart upon him, and that You should remember him every morning, and try him every moment?"

Rav Kruspedai said in the name of Rabbi Johanan that on Rosh Hashanah, three books are opened in Heaven — one for the thoroughly wicked, one for the thoroughly righteous, and one for those in between. The thoroughly righteous are immediately inscribed definitively in the book of life. The thoroughly wicked are immediately inscribed definitively in the book of death. And the fate of those in between is suspended from Rosh Hashanah to Yom Kippur. If they deserve well, then they are inscribed in the book of life; if they do not deserve well, then they are inscribed in the book of death. Rabbi Abin said that  tells us this when it says, "Let them be blotted out of the book of the living, and not be written with the righteous." "Let them be blotted out from the book" refers to the book of the wicked. "Of the living" refers to the book of the righteous. "And not be written with the righteous" refers to the book of those in between. "Blot me, I pray" refers to the book of the wicked. "Out of Your book" refers to the book of the righteous. "That you have written" refers to the book of those in between. It was taught in a Baraita that the House of Shammai said that there will be three groups at the Day of Judgment — one of thoroughly righteous, one of thoroughly wicked, and one of those in between. The thoroughly righteous will immediately be inscribed definitively as entitled to everlasting life; the thoroughly wicked will immediately be inscribed definitively as doomed to Gehinnom, as  says, "And many of them who sleep in the dust of the earth shall awake, some to everlasting life and some to reproaches and everlasting abhorrence." Those in between will go down to Gehinnom and scream and rise again, as  says, "And I will bring the third part through the fire, and will refine them as silver is refined, and will try them as gold is tried. They shall call on My name and I will answer them." Of them, Hannah said in 1 Samuel , "The Lord kills and makes alive, He brings down to the grave and brings up."

The Jerusalem Talmud reported that Jews wear white on the High Holy Days. Rabbi Hama the son of Rabbi Hanina and Rabbi Hoshaiah disagreed about how to interpret , "And what great nation is there, that has statutes and ordinances so righteous as all this law." One said: "And what great nation is there?" Ordinarily those who know they are on trial wear black, wrap themselves in black, and let their beards grow, since they do not know how their trial will turn out. But that is not how it is with Israel. Rather, on the day of their trial, on Rosh Hashanah, they wear white, wrap themselves in white, and shave their beards and eat, drink, and rejoice, for they know that God does miracles for them. The other said: "And what great nation is there?" Ordinarily, if the ruler directs that the trial is on a certain day, and the robber says that the trial is on the next day, they listen to the ruler. But that is not how it is with God. The earthly court says that Rosh Hashanah falls on a certain day, and God directs the ministering angels to set up the platform, let the defenders rise, and let the prosecutors rise, for God's children have announced, that it is Rosh Hashanah. If the court determined that the month of Elul spanned a full 30 days, so that Rosh Hashanah would fall on the next day, then God would direct the ministering angels to remove the platform, remove the defense attorneys, remove the prosecutors, for God's children had declared Elul a full month. For  says of Rosh Hashanah, "For it is a statute for Israel, an ordinance of the God of Jacob," and thus if it is not a statute for Israel, then it also is not an ordinance of God.

A Baraita taught that on Rosh Hashanah, God remembered each of Sarah, Rachel, and Hannah and decreed that they would bear children.

Rabbi Abbahu taught that Jews sound a blast with a shofar made from a ram's horn on Rosh Hashanah, because God instructed them to do so to bring before God the memory of the binding of Isaac, in whose stead Abraham sacrificed a ram, and thus God will ascribe it to worshipers as if they had bound themselves before God. Rabbi Isaac asked why one sounds (tokin) a blast on Rosh Hashanah, and the Gemara answered that God states in  "Sound (tiku) a shofar."

Rabbi Joshua son of Korchah taught that Moses stayed on Mount Sinai 40 days and 40 nights, reading the Written Law by day, and studying the Oral Law by night. After those 40 days, on the 17th of Tammuz, Moses took the Tablets of the Law, descended into the camp, broke the Tablets in pieces, and killed the Israelite sinners. Moses then spent 40 days in the camp, until he had burned the Golden Calf, ground it into powder like the dust of the earth, destroyed the idol worship from among the Israelites, and put every tribe in its place. And on the New Moon (Rosh Chodesh) of Elul (the month before Rosh Hashanah), God told Moses in  "Come up to Me on the mount," and let them sound the shofar throughout the camp, for, behold, Moses has ascended the mount, so that they do not go astray again after the worship of idols. God was exalted with that shofar, as  says, "God is exalted with a shout, the Lord with the sound of a trumpet." Therefore, the Sages instituted that the shofar should be sounded on the New Moon of Elul every year.

Rabbi Yannai taught that from the very beginning of the world's creation, God foresaw the deeds of the righteous and the wicked, and provided Yom Kippur in response. And , "one day," teaches that God gave the righteous one day — Yom Kippur.

Similarly, Rabbi Judah bar Simon interpreted , "And God called the light day," to symbolize Jacob/Israel; "and the darkness he called night," to symbolize Esau; "and there was evening," to symbolize Esau; "and there was morning," to symbolize Jacob. And "one day" teaches that God gave Israel one unique day over which darkness has no influence — the Day of Atonement.

Rabbi Akiva taught that because  says, "the tenth day of this seventh month is the Day of Atonement," and  says, "It shall be to you a Sabbath," whenever Yom Kippur coincides with a Sabbath, whoever unwittingly performs work is liable for violating both Yom Kippur and the Sabbath. But Rabbi Ishmael said that such a person is liable on only a single count.

The Mishnah taught that on Yom Kippur, one must not eat, drink, wash, anoint oneself, put on sandals, or have sexual intercourse. Rabbi Eliezer (whom the halachah follows) taught that a king or bride may wash the face, and a woman after childbirth may put on sandals. But the sages forbad doing so. The Tosefta taught that one must not put on even felt shoes. But the Tosefta taught that minors can do all these things except put on sandals, for appearance's sake. The Mishnah held a person culpable to punishment for eating an amount of food equal to a large date (with its pit included), or for drinking a mouthful of liquid. For the purpose of calculating the amount consumed, one combines all amounts of food together, and all amounts liquids together, but not amounts of foods together with amounts of liquids. The Mishnah obliged one who unknowingly or forgetfully ate and drank to bring only one sin-offering. But one who unknowingly or forgetfully ate and performed labor had to bring two sin-offerings. The Mishnah did not hold one culpable who ate foods unfit to eat, or drank liquids unfit to drink (like fish-brine). The Mishnah taught that one should not afflict children at all on Yom Kippur. In the two years before they become Bar or Bat Mitzvah, one should train children to become used to religious observances (for example by fasting for several hours). The Mishnah taught that one should give food to a pregnant woman who smelled food and requested it. One should feed to a sick person at the direction of experts, and if no experts are present, one feeds a sick person who requests food. The Mishnah taught that one may even give unclean food to one seized by a ravenous hunger, until the person's eyes are opened. Rabbi Matthia ben Heresh said that one who has a sore throat may drink medicine even on the Sabbath, because it presented the possibility of danger to human life, and every danger to human life suspends the laws of the Sabbath.

Rabbi Ishmael derived this rule from what had been taught in a Baraita: One might read , "And you shall afflict your souls on the ninth day," literally to mean that one begins fasting the entire day on the ninth day of the month;  therefore says, "in the evening." One might read "in the evening" to mean "after dark" (which the Hebrew calendar would reckon as part of the tenth day);  therefore says, "in the ninth day." The Gemara thus concluded that one begins fasting while it is still day on the ninth day, adding some time from the profane day (the ninth) to the holy day (the tenth). Because  says, "You shall rest," the Gemara applied the rule to Sabbaths as well. Because  says "your Sabbath" (your day of rest), the Gemara applied the rule to other Festivals (in addition to Yom Kippur); wherever the law creates an obligation to rest, we add time to that obligation from the surrounding profane days to the holy day. Rabbi Akiva, however, read , "And you shall afflict your souls on the ninth day," to teach the lesson learned by Rav Hiyya bar Rav from Difti (that is, Dibtha, below the Tigris, southeast of Babylon). Rav Hiyya bar Rav from Difti taught in a Baraita that  says "the ninth day" to indicate that if people eat and drink on the ninth day, then Scripture credits it to them as if they fasted on both the ninth and the tenth days (because  calls the eating and drinking on the ninth day "fasting").

The Mishnah taught that the High Priest said a short prayer in the outer area. The Jerusalem Talmud taught that this was the prayer of the High Priest on the Day of Atonement, when he left the Holy Place whole and in one piece: "May it be pleasing before you, Lord, our God of our fathers, that a decree of exile not be issued against us, not this day or this year, but if a decree of exile should be issued against us, then let it be exile to a place of Torah. May it be pleasing before you, Lord, our God and God of our fathers, that a decree of want not be issued against us, not this day or this year, but if a decree of want should be issued against us, then let it be a want because of the performance of religious duties. May it be pleasing before you, Lord, our God and God of our fathers, that this year be a year of cheap food, full bellies, good business; a year in which the earth forms clods, then is parched so as to form scabs, and then moistened with dew, so that your people, Israel, will not be in need of the help of one another. And do not heed the prayer of travelers that it not rain." The Rabbis of Caesarea added, "And concerning your people, Israel, that they not exercise dominion over one another." And for the people who live in the Sharon plain he would say this prayer, "May it be pleasing before you, Lord, our God and God of our fathers, that our houses not turn into our graves."

Reading Song of Songs , Rabbi Joshua ben Levi compared Israel to a nut-tree. Rabbi Azariah taught that just as when a nut falls into the dirt, you can wash it, restore it to its former condition, and make it fit for eating, so however much Israel may be defiled with iniquities all the rest of the year, when the Day of Atonement comes, it makes atonement for them, as  says, "For on this day shall atonement be made for you, to cleanse you."

Resh Lakish taught that great is repentance, for because of it, Heaven accounts premeditated sins as errors, as  says, "Return, O Israel, to the Lord, your God, for you have stumbled in your iniquity." "Iniquity" refers to premeditated sins, and yet Hosea calls them "stumbling," implying that Heaven considers those who repent of intentional sins as if they acted accidentally. But the Gemara said that that is not all, for Resh Lakish also said that repentance is so great that with it, Heaven accounts premeditated sins as though they were merits, as  says, "And when the wicked turns from his wickedness, and does that which is lawful and right, he shall live thereby." The Gemara reconciled the two positions, clarifying that in the sight of Heaven, repentance derived from love transforms intentional sins to merits, while repentance out of fear transforms intentional sins to unwitting transgressions.

The Jerusalem Talmud taught that the evil impulse (yetzer hara) craves only what is forbidden. The Jerusalem Talmud illustrated this by relating that on the Day of Atonement, Rabbi Mana went to visit Rabbi Haggai, who was feeling weak. Rabbi Haggai told Rabbi Mana that he was thirsty. Rabbi Mana told Rabbi Haggai to go drink something. Rabbi Mana left and after a while came back. Rabbi Mana asked Rabbi Haggai what happened to his thirst. Rabbi Haggai replied that when Rabbi Mana told him that he could drink, his thirst went away.

Rav Mana of Sha'ab (in Galilee) and Rav Joshua of Siknin in the name of Rav Levi compared repentance at the High Holidays to the case of a province that owed arrears on its taxes to the king, and the king came to collect the debt. When the king was within ten miles, the nobility of the province came out and praised him, so he freed the province of a third of its debt. When he was within five miles, the middle-class people of the province came out and praised him, so he freed the province of another third of its debt. When he entered the province, all the people of the province — men, women, and children — came out and praised him, so he freed them of all of their debt. The king told them to let bygones be bygones; from then on they would start a new account. In a similar manner, on the eve of Rosh Hashanah, the leaders of the generation fast, and God absolves them of a third of their iniquities. From Rosh Hashanah to Yom Kippur, private individuals fast, and God absolves them of a third of their iniquities. On Yom Kippur, everyone fasts — men, women and children — and God tells Israel to let bygones be bygones; from then onwards we begin a new account. From Yom Kippur to Sukkot, all Israel are busy with the performance of religious duties. One is busy with a sukkah, one with a lulav. On the first day of Sukkot, all Israel stand in the presence of God with their palm-branches and etrogs in honor of God's name, and God tells them to let bygones be bygones; from now we begin a new account. Rabbi Aha explained that the words, "For with You there is forgiveness," in signify that forgiveness waits with God from Rosh Hashanah onward. And forgiveness waits that long so (in the words of ) "that You may be feared" and God may impose God's awe upon God's creatures (through the suspense and uncertainty).

The Mishnah taught that a sukkah can be no more than 20 cubits high. Rabbi Judah, however, declared taller sukkot valid. The Mishnah taught that a sukkah must be at least 10 handbreadths high, have three walls, and have more shade than sun. The House of Shammai declared invalid a sukkah made 30 days or more before the festival, but the House of Hillel pronounced it valid. The Mishnah taught that if one made the sukkah for the purpose of the festival, even at the beginning of the year, it is valid.

The Mishnah taught that a sukkah under a tree is as invalid as a sukkah within a house. If one sukkah is erected above another, the upper one is valid, but the lower is invalid. Rabbi Judah said that if there are no occupants in the upper one, then the lower one is valid.

It invalidates a sukkah to spread a sheet over the sukkah because of the sun, or beneath it because of falling leaves, or over the frame of a four-post bed. One may spread a sheet, however, over the frame of a two-post bed.

It is not valid to train a vine, gourd, or ivy to cover a sukkah and then cover it with sukkah covering (s'chach). If, however, the sukkah-covering exceeds the vine, gourd, or ivy in quantity, or if the vine, gourd, or ivy is detached, it is valid. The general rule is that one may not use for sukkah-covering anything that is susceptible to ritual impurity (tumah) or that does not grow from the soil. But one may use for sukkah-covering anything not susceptible to ritual impurity that grows from the soil.

Bundles of straw, wood, or brushwood may not serve as sukkah-covering. But any of them, if they are untied, are valid. All materials are valid for the walls.

Rabbi Judah taught that one may use planks for the sukkah-covering, but Rabbi Meir taught that one may not. The Mishnah taught that it is valid to place a plank four handbreadths wide over the sukkah, provided that one does not sleep under it.

If its top is broken off or its leaves detached from the stem, it is invalid. If its leaves are merely spread apart but still joined to the stem at their roots, it is valid. Rabbi Judah taught that in that case, one should tie the leaves at the top. A palm-branch that is three handbreadths in length, long enough to wave, is valid. The Gemara explained that a withered palm branch fails to meets the requirement of  because it is not (in the term of ) "goodly." Rabbi Johanan taught in the name of Rabbi Simeon ben Yohai that a stolen palm-branch is unfit because use of it would be a precept fulfilled through a transgression, which is forbidden. Rabbi Ammi also stated that a withered palm-branch is invalid because it is not in the word of  "goodly," and a stolen one is invalid because it constitutes a precept fulfilled through a transgression.

Similarly, the Mishnah taught that a stolen or withered myrtle is not valid. If its tip is broken off, or its leaves are severed, or its berries are more numerous than its leaves, it is invalid. But if one picks off berries to diminish their number, it is valid. One may not, however, pick them on the Festival.

Similarly, the Mishnah taught that a stolen or withered willow-branch is invalid. One whose tip is broken off or whose leaves are severed is invalid. One that has shriveled or lost some of its leaves, or one grown in a naturally watered soil, is valid.

Rabbi Ishmael taught that one must have three myrtle-branches, two willow-branches, one palm-branch, and one etrog. Even if two of the myrtle-branches have their tips broken off and only one is whole, the lulav set is valid. Rabbi Tarfon taught that even if all three have their tips broken off, the set is valid. Rabbi Akiva taught that just as it is necessary to have only one palm-branch and one etrog, so it is necessary to have only one myrtle-branch and one willow-branch.

The Mishnah taught that an etrog that is stolen or withered is invalid. If the larger part of it is covered with scars, or if its nipple is removed, if it is peeled, split, perforated, so that any part is missing, it is invalid. If only its lesser part is covered with scars, if its stalk was missing, or if it is perforated but nothing of it is missing, it is valid. A dark-colored etrog is invalid. If it is green as a leek, Rabbi Meir declares it valid and Rabbi Judah declares it invalid. Rabbi Meir taught that the minimum size of an etrog is that of a nut. Rabbi Judah taught that it is that of an egg. Rabbi Judah taught that the maximum size is such that two can be held in one hand. Rabbi Jose said even one that can be hold only in both hands.

The Mishnah taught that the absence of one of the four kinds of plants used for the lulav — the palm-branch, the etrog, the myrtle, or the willow — invalidates the others. The Gemara explained that this is because  says, "And you shall take," signifying the taking of them all together. Rav Hanan bar Abba argued that one who has all of the four species fulfills the requirement even if one does not take them in hand bound together. They raised an objection from a Baraita that taught: Of the four kinds used for the lulav, two — the etrog and the palm — are fruit-bearing, and two — the myrtle and the willow — are not. Those that bear fruit must be joined with those that do not bear fruit, and those that do not bear fruit must be joined with those that bear fruit. Thus a person does not fulfill the obligation unless they are all bound in one bundle. And so it is, the Baraita taught, with Israel's conciliation with God: It is achieved only when the people of Israel are united as one group.

Rabbi Mani taught that , "All my bones shall say: 'Lord, who is like You?'" alludes to the lulav. The rib of the lulav resembles the spine; the myrtle resembles the eye; the willow resembles the mouth; and the etrog resembles the heart. The Psalmist teaches that no parts of the body are greater than these, which outweigh in importance the rest of the body.

The Gemara taught that one who prepares a lulav recites the blessing, ". . . Who has given us life, has sustained us, and has enabled us to reach this season." When one takes the lulav to fulfill the obligation under , one recites: ". . . Who has sanctified us with Your commandments and has commanded us concerning the taking of the lulav." One who makes a sukkah recites: "Blessed are You, O Lord . . . Who has given us life, has sustained us, and has enabled us to reach this season." When one enters to sit in a sukkah, one recites: "Blessed are You . . . Who has sanctified us with Your commandments and has commanded us to sit in the sukkah."

Rabbi Eliezer taught that during the seven days of Sukkot, one must eat 14 meals in a sukkah — one on each day and one on each night. The Sages of the Mishnah, however, taught that one is not required to eat a fixed number of meals a sukkah, except that one must eat a meal in a sukkah on the first night of Sukkot. Rabbi Eliezer said in addition that if one did not eat in a sukkah on the first night of Sukkot, one may make up for it on the last night of the Festival. The Sages of the Mishnah, however, taught that there is no making up for this, and of this Ecclesiastes  said: "That which is crooked cannot be made straight, and that which is wanting cannot be numbered." And so, just as in a normal dwelling, one has one meal by day and one by night, so in the sukkah, one should have one meal by day and one by night. And the Gemara explained that the Sages taught that , "You shall dwell," implies that just as in one's dwelling, one eats if one wishes, and does not eat if one does not wish, so also with a sukkah one eats only if one wishes. But if so, the Gemara asked, why is the meal on the first night mandatory? Rabbi Johanan answered in the name of Rabbi Simeon ben Jehozadak that with regard to Sukkot,  says "the fifteenth," just as  says "the fifteenth" with regard to Passover (implying similarity in the laws for the two Festivals). And for Passover,  says, "At evening you shall eat unleavened bread," indicating that only the first night is obligatory (to eat unleavened bread). So also for Sukkot, the only first night is also obligatory (to eat in the sukkah). The Gemara then reported that Bira said in the name of Rabbi Ammi that Rabbi Eliezer recanted his statement that one is obliged to eat 14 meals in the sukkah, and changed his position to agree with the Sages. The Gemara taught that a desert later in the holiday may be regarded as a compensating meal to fulfill one's obligation to eat the first meal.

Rabbi Joshua maintained that rejoicing on a Festival is a religious duty. For it was taught in a Baraita: Rabbi Eliezer said: A person has nothing else to do on a Festival aside from either eating and drinking or sitting and studying. Rabbi Joshua said: Divide it: Devote half of the Festival to eating and drinking, and half to the House of Study. Rabbi Johanan said: Both deduce this from the same verse. One verse  says, "a solemn assembly to the Lord your God," while  says, "there shall be a solemn assembly to you." Rabbi Eliezer held that this means either entirely to God or entirely to you. But Rabbi Joshua held: Divide it: Devote half the Festival to God and half to yourself.

Leviticus chapter 24
For the Gemara taught that Rabbi Nehemiah would argue that the Israelites imprisoned the blasphemer (in ) when they did not yet know whether he was liable to execution. But the Rabbis taught that the blasphemer's incarceration was an ad hoc decision (from which one cannot generalize).

But they did not know the correct form of death penalty for him, for God had not yet been specified what to do to him, as  says, "for it had not [yet] been specified what should be done to him." With regard to the blasphemer, the Sifra read , "until the decision of the Lord should be made clear to them," to indicate that they did not know whether or not the blasphemer was to be executed. (And if they placed the blasphemer together with the wood gatherer, it might have caused the blasphemer unnecessary fear, as he might have concluded that he was on death row. Therefore, they held the two separately.)

Rabbi Meir deduced from  that anyone who cursed God using a substitute for God's Name was subject to execution (since  does not mention God's Name). But the Sages maintained that blasphemy was punishable by death only when the blasphemer used God's ineffable Name, and blasphemy employing substitutes was the object of an injunction (but not punishable by death).

Noting that  commands, "He that curses his father or his mother shall surely be put to death," and  commands, "Whoever curses his God shall bear his sin," the Rabbis taught in a Baraita that Scripture likens cursing parents to cursing God.  (20:12 in NJSP) commands, "Honor your father and your mother," and  directs, "Honor the Lord with your substance," Scripture likens the honor due to parents to that due to God. And as  commands, "You shall fear your father and mother," and  commands, "The Lord your God you shall fear and you shall serve," Scripture likens the fear of parents to the fear of God. But the Baraita conceded that with respect to striking (which  addresses with regard to parents), that it is certainly impossible (with respect to God). The Baraita concluded that these comparisons between parents and God are only logical, since the three (God, the mother, and the father) are partners in creation of the child. For the Rabbis taught in a Baraita that there are three partners in the creation of a person — God, the father, and the mother. When one honors one's father and mother, God considers it as if God had dwelt among them and they had honored God. And a Tanna taught before Rav Nachman that when one vexes one's father and mother, God considers it right not to dwell among them, for had God dwelt among them, they would have vexed God.

The Gemara taught that the words "eye for eye" in  meant pecuniary compensation. Rabbi Simon ben Yohai asked those who would take the words literally how they would enforce equal justice where a blind man put out the eye of another man, or an amputee cut off the hand of another, or where a lame person broke the leg of another. Abaye reported that a sage of the school of Hezekiah taught that  said "eye for eye" and "life for life," but not "life and eye for eye," and it could sometimes happen that eye and life would be taken for an eye, as when the offender died while being blinded. Rav Papa said in the name of Rava that  referred explicitly to healing, and the verse would not make sense if one assumed that retaliation was meant. As the latter case plainly indicated pecuniary compensation, so must the former.

In medieval Jewish interpretation
The parashah is discussed in these medieval Jewish sources:

Leviticus chapter 22

Drawing on a discussion in the Babylonian Talmud (reported in "In classical rabbinic interpretation: Chapter 22" above), Maimonides taught that all Jews are commanded regarding the sanctification of God's Name, as  states: "And I shall be sanctified amidst the children of Israel." And they are similarly warned against desecrating God's Name, as  states, "And they shall not desecrate My holy Name." Maimonides taught that this implies that should a gentile force a Jew to violate one of the Torah's commandments at the threat of death, the Jew should violate the commandment rather than be killed, because  states concerning the commandments: "which a man will perform and live by them." The commandments were given so that one may live by them and not die because of them. If one dies rather than transgress a commandment, one is held accountable for one's life. But Maimonides taught that this rule applies with regard to commandments other than the worship of other gods, forbidden sexual relations, and murder. With regard to these three sins, if one is ordered to transgress one of them or be killed, one should sacrifice one's life rather than transgress. And Maimonides taught that these general rules apply when the gentile desires something for the gentile's own personal benefit — for example, to build a house for the gentile on the Sabbath. But if the gentile's intention is solely to have the Jew violate the commandments, the following rules apply: If there are not ten other Jews present, the Jew should transgress the commandment to stay alive. But if the gentile forces the Jew to transgress a commandment in the presence of ten Jews, the Jew should sacrifice the Jew's life and not transgress even one of the commandments. Maimonides further taught that in times when a wicked ruler like Nebuchadnezzar or his like issues a decree against the Jews to nullify their faith or one of the commandments, one should sacrifice one's life rather than transgress any of the commandments, whether one is compelled to transgress in the presence of ten Jews or only among gentiles. Maimonides taught that when, as required above, one sacrifices one's life and does not transgress, that person sanctifies God's Name, and there is no higher level above that person. And when, under such circumstances, one instead transgresses, that person desecrates God's Name. But Maimonides taught that one who could escape from under the power of such a wicked ruler and fails to do so is like a dog who returns his vomit. That person is considered as one who worships false gods willingly and will be prevented from reaching the World to Come and will descend to the lowest levels of Gehinnom. And Maimonides taught that whoever consciously transgresses one of the commandments without being forced to, in a spirit of derision, to arouse Divine anger, desecrates God's name. Conversely, anyone who refrains from committing a sin or performs a commandment for no ulterior motive, neither out of fear or dread, nor to seek honor, but for God's sake — as Joseph held himself back from his master's wife — sanctifies God's name.

Leviticus chapter 23
Maimonides taught that the object of the Sabbath (mentioned in ) was the rest that it affords. One-seventh of the life of every person, small or great, passes in comfort and rest from trouble and exertion. In addition, the Sabbath perpetuates remembrance of the Creation.

Maimonides taught that the object of the Fast of Atonement (mentioned in ) is the sense of repentance that it creates. Maimonides noted that it was on Yom Kippur that Moses came down from Mount Sinai with the second tablets and announced to the Israelites God's pardon of their sin with the Golden Calf. God therefore appointed Yom Kippur forever as a day devoted to repentance and the true worship of God. For this reason, the law interdicts all material enjoyment, trouble and care for the body, and work, so that people might spend the day confessing their sins and abandoning them.

The holy days also promote the good feeling that people should have to each other in their social and political relations.

According to Maimonides, Passover (mentioned in ) is kept seven days, because a week is the intermediate unit of time between a day and a month. Passover teaches people to remember the miracles that God performed in Egypt, encouraging people to thank God repeatedly and to lead a modest and humble life. Jews therefore eat unleavened bread and bitter herbs on Passover in memory of what happened to the Israelites. And they eat unleavened bread for a week because if the eating were only for one day, Jews might not notice it.

Maimonides taught that Shavuot (mentioned in ) is the anniversary of the Revelation on Mount Sinai. To increase the importance of this day, Jews count the days that pass from the preceding festival of Passover, just as one who expects an intimate friend to visit on a certain day counts the days and even the hours until the friend comes. This is why Jews count the days that pass since the offering of the Omer, between the anniversary of the Israelites' departure from Egypt and the anniversary of the Lawgiving. As the Revelation at Mount Sinai took place on one day, so Jews keep its anniversary only one day.

Maimonides wrote that Jews likewise keep Rosh Hashanah (mentioned in ) for one day, for it is a day of repentance, on which Jews are stirred up from forgetfulness, and for this reason the shofar is blown on that day. According to Maimonides, Rosh Hashanah is a preparation for and an introduction to Yom Kippur, as is plain from the tradition about the days between Rosh Hashanah and Yom Kippur.

It is kept in the autumn because, as  says, it is "When you have gathered in your labors out of the field," and thus when people can rest free from pressing labors. Maimonides cited the ninth book of Aristotle's Ethics for the proposition that harvest festivals were a general custom, quoting Aristotle to report, "In ancient times, the sacrifices and assemblies of the people took place after the ingathering of the corn and the fruit, as if the sacrifices were offered on account of the harvest." Maimonides noted the temperate nature of autumn as another reason for Sukkot falling in that season, making it possible to dwell in booths free of great heat and troublesome rain. Maimonides taught that Sukkot reminds Jews of the miracles that God performed in the wilderness, once again to induced Jews to thank God and lead a modest and humble life. And Jews join to Sukkot the Feast of Shemini Atzeret to complete in the comfort of their homes their rejoicings, which cannot be perfect in booths. To remember this, Jews take the most pleasant fruit of the land, branches that smell best, most beautiful leaves, and also the best of herbs, that is, the willows of the brook. The four species joined in the lulav and etrog also were (1) plentiful in those days in the Land of Israel, so that everyone could easily get them, (2) of a good appearance, and in the case of the etrog and myrtle, excellent smell, and (3) keep fresh and green for seven days.

The Daas Zekeinim explained that it was only at the completion of the harvest and Sukkot that one was able to be completely joyful.

In modern interpretation
The parashah is discussed in these modern sources:

Leviticus chapters 21–24

Leviticus chapter 23
In 1950, the Committee on Jewish Law and Standards of Conservative Judaism ruled: "Refraining from the use of a motor vehicle is an important aid in the maintenance of the Sabbath spirit of repose. Such restraint aids, moreover, in keeping the members of the family together on the Sabbath. However where a family resides beyond reasonable walking distance from the synagogue, the use of a motor vehicle for the purpose of synagogue attendance shall in no wise be construed as a violation of the Sabbath but, on the contrary, such attendance shall be deemed an expression of loyalty to our faith. . . . [I]n the spirit of a living and developing Halachah responsive to the changing needs of our people, we declare it to be permitted to use electric lights on the Sabbath for the purpose of enhancing the enjoyment of the Sabbath, or reducing personal discomfort in the performance of a mitzvah."

In 2014, the Committee on Jewish Law and Standards of Conservative Judaism ruled that women are now equally responsible for observing commandments as men have been.

Leviticus chapter 24
Douglas noted that the Israelites put him to death by stoning, and the Hebrew stem of the verb translated as "to stone" means to hurl or pelt. Douglas suggested that if wordplay is admitted, the story could be read to say that the blasphemer hurled insults at the Name of God, and then God ordained that the blasphemer should die by stones hurled at him. Employing the English metaphor of mud-slinging, Douglas compared the end of the story to: "he has slung mud, let him die by mud slung at him." Selecting possible meanings of character names that fit the story, Douglas suggested that the story told to children could go like this: Once there was a man with no name, son of Retribution, grandson of Lawsuit, from the house of Judgment, who pelted insults at the Name, and God said that he should die — because he pelted God's Name, he should be pelted to death. Douglas proposed that by quoting the "eye for eye" law in a jingly form, in a peculiar circumstance where it does not really fit, surrounded by funny names, the writer of Leviticus may be trying to say something else about the measure-for-measure principle, testing the universal validity of the principle of retribution. Douglas posited that the "subtlety of thought and the high degree of literary control exerted throughout Leviticus" suggest that the priestly writer referred to other people's legal codes in an ironic if not disingenuous vein. Douglas concluded that the writer of Leviticus aped the style of foreign laws when touching on "negative reciprocity," but it is rather "positive reciprocity, gift with gift," that is the central theme in Leviticus. The writer of Leviticus sought to show that God's compassion and God's justice were available to be perceived by anyone reading the Bible's account of God's covenant.

Bamberger reported that the inability of Moses to handle these cases on his own troubled the Rabbis.

Commandments
According to the Sefer ha-Chinuch, there are 24 positive and 39 negative commandments in the parashah:
A Kohen must not defile himself for anyone except certain relatives.
To mourn for a close relative
An impure Kohen, following immersion, must wait until after sundown before returning to service.
A Kohen must not marry a woman who had forbidden relations.
A Kohen must not marry a woman born from a disqualified marriage.
A Kohen must not marry a divorcee.
To dedicate the Kohen for service
The High Priest must not enter under the same roof as a corpse.
The High Priest must not defile himself for any relative.
The High Priest must marry a virgin.
The High Priest must not marry a widow.
The High Priest must not have sexual relations with a widow even outside of marriage.
A Kohen with a physical blemish must not serve.
A Kohen with a temporary blemish must not serve.
A Kohen with a physical blemish must not enter the sanctuary or approach the altar.
Impure Kohanim must not do service in the Temple.
An impure Kohen must not eat terumah.
A non-Kohen must not eat terumah.
A hired worker or a Jewish bondsman of a Kohen must not eat terumah.
An uncircumcised person must not eat terumah.
A woman born from a disqualified marriage must not eat terumah.
Not to eat produce from which the tithes have not been separated
Not to dedicate a blemished animal for the altar
To offer only unblemished animals
Not to wound dedicated animals
Not to sprinkle the blood of a blemished animal
Not to slaughter a blemished animal for an offering
Not to burn the fat of a blemished animal on the altar
Not to castrate animals
Not to sacrifice blemished animals even if offered by non-Jews
To offer only animals which are at least eight days old
Not to slaughter an animal and its offspring on the same day
Not to profane God's Name
To sanctify God's Name
To rest on the first day of Passover
Not to do prohibited labor on the first day of Passover
To offer the musaf offering all seven days of Passover
To rest on the seventh day of Passover
Not to do prohibited labor on the seventh day of Passover
To offer the wave offering from the meal of the new wheat
Not to eat bread from new grain before the omer
Not to eat parched grains from new grain before the omer
Not to eat ripened grains from new grain before the omer
To count the omer
To bring two loaves to accompany the Shavuot sacrifice
To offer the musaf offering on Yom Kippur
To rest on Shavuot
Not to do prohibited labor on Shavuot

To rest on Rosh Hashanah
Not to do prohibited labor on Rosh Hashanah
To offer the musaf offering on Rosh Hashanah
To fast on Yom Kippur
Not to do prohibited labor on Yom Kippur
Not to eat or drink on Yom Kippur
To rest from prohibited labor on Yom Kippur
To rest on Sukkot
Not to do prohibited labor on Sukkot
To offer the musaf offering all the days of Sukkot
To rest on Shmini Atzeret
To offer the musaf offering on Shmini Atzeret
Not to do prohibited labor on Shmini Atzeret
To take up a lulav and etrog all seven days
To dwell in a sukkah for the seven days of Sukkot

In the liturgy

The laws of a priest's family eating meat from sacrifices in  provide an application of the eleventh of the Thirteen Rules for interpreting the Torah in the Baraita of Rabbi Ishmael that many Jews read as part of the readings before the Pesukei d'Zimrah prayer service. The eleventh rule provides that any item that was included in a generalization but was then singled out to be treated as a special case is not governed by the generalization unless Scripture explicitly returns it to the generalization.  states the general rule that a priest's entire household could eat meat from sacrifices. But  then says that if a priest's daughter married a non-priest, then she could no longer eat meat from sacrifices. What if she was then widowed or divorced without children and returned to live with her father's household? Reading , one might think that she still could not eat meat from sacrifices, but  explicitly returns her to the general rule that she could eat meat from sacrifices.

The Haggadah reports that Abraham ran to the cattle to commemorate the ox in the reading for Passover, deducing the season from the report in  that Lot fed his visitors matzah.

Haftarah

Notes

Further reading
The parashah has parallels or is discussed in these sources:

Ancient
The Code of Hammurabi, sections 194–214. Babylonia, Circa 1780 BCE. In, e.g., James B. Pritchard. Ancient Near Eastern Texts Relating to the Old Testament, page 175. Princeton: Princeton University Press, 1969.

Plato. Laws 6:759. Greece, 4th century BCE. In, e.g., The Laws of Plato. Translated by Thomas L. Pangle, page 145. New York: Basic Books, 1980. (priests sound of body).

Biblical
 (Yom Kippur);  (corners of fields).
 (Passover, inquiry of God on the law);  (inquiry of God on the law);  (inquiry of God on the law);  (Passover, Shavuot);  (holidays).
 (three pilgrim festivals);  (eye for eye);  (Sukkot).
 (Sukkot).
 (Sukkot);  (northern feast like Sukkot).
 (keeping the Sabbath);  (universally observed Sabbath).
 (Sukkot).
 (Sukkot).
 (Sukkot).
 (Sukkot).
 (Sukkot);  (Sukkot);  (three Pilgrim festivals).

Early nonrabbinic
John  (Sukkot).

Classical rabbinic
Mishnah: Peah 1:1–8:9; Demai 1:1–7:8; Sheviit 2:1; Terumot 3:9, 6:6–7:4; Challah 1:1; Bikkurim 1:8; Shabbat 1:1–24:5; Pesachim 1:1–10:9; Yoma 1:1–8:9; Sukkah 1:1–5:8; Beitzah 1:1–5:7; Rosh Hashanah 1:1–4:9; Megillah 1:5, 3:5–6, 4:7; Yevamot 2:4, 6:2–5, 7:1–8:2, 8:6, 9:2, 9:4–6, 10:3; Nedarim 11:3; Kiddushin 1:7, 1:9; Sanhedrin 2:1, 4:1, 6:1, 7:4–5, 9:1, 6; Makkot 3:8–9; Horayot 3:4–5, 8; Zevachim 9:5, 14:2; Menachot 2:2–3, 3:6, 4:2–3, 5:1, 5:3, 5:6–7, 6:2, 6:5–7, 8:1, 9:4, 10:1–11:2, 11:4–5, 11:9; Chullin 4:5, 5:5; Bekhorot 6:1–7:7; Keritot 1:1; Meilah 2:6; Kinnim 1:1; Parah 2:1. Land of Israel, circa 200 CE. In, e.g., The Mishnah: A New Translation. Translated by Jacob Neusner, pages 14–36, 41, 70, 100, 108, 148, 168, 179–208, 229–51, 265–307, 317, 321, 340, 352–54, 358, 360, 489, 585, 589, 593, 602, 604, 618, 694–95, 720, 730, 735–36, 739–45, 748, 752, 755, 757, 774–75, 777, 800, 802, 836, 854, 883, 1014. New Haven: Yale University Press, 1988.
Tosefta: Peah 1:1–4:21; Demai 1:28; Challah 2:7; Bikkurim 2:4; Shabbat 1:1–17:29; Pisha (Pesachim) 1:1–10:13; Kippurim (Yoma) 1:1–4:17; Sukkah 1:1–4:28; Yom Tov (Beitzah) 1:1–4:11; Rosh Hashanah 1:1–2:18; Megillah 3:5–6, 8; Yevamot 10:3, 5; Sanhedrin 4:1, 12:1; Makkot 5:4; Shevuot 1:6, 3:8; Eduyot 3:4; Shechitat Chullin 4:5; Menachot 7:7, 20, 10:26, 11:15; Bekhorot 2:3–4, 7–10, 17–19, 3:2, 6, 20, 24–25; 4:1–5:9; Temurah 1:10–11. Land of Israel, circa 250 CE. In, e.g., The Tosefta: Translated from the Hebrew, with a New Introduction. Translated by Jacob Neusner, volume 1, pages 47–76, 83, 339, 349, 357–427, 419, 471–522, 541–618, 645, 718; volume 2, pages 1156, 1185, 1215, 1221, 1233, 1259, 1388, 1435, 1438, 1455, 1459. 1483, 1485, 1521. Peabody, Massachusetts: Hendrickson Publishers, 2002.
Sifra Emor (211:1–244:1). Land of Israel, circa 250–350 CE. In, e.g., Sifra: An Analytical Translation. Translated by Jacob Neusner, volume 3, pages 161–290. Atlanta: Scholars Press, 1988.
Jerusalem Talmud: Berakhot 4b, 57b, 75b; Peah 1a–73b; Demai 56a; Sheviit 5b, 27b–28a, 83a; Maaser Sheni 13a; Challah 2a, 6a, 8a, 11a; Orlah 2b–3a, 19a, 34a, 41b; Bikkurim 6a, 11a–12b; Shabbat 1a–113b; Pesachim 1a–86a; Yoma 1a–57a; Sukkah 1a–33b; Beitzah 1a–49b; Rosh Hashanah 1a–27a; Taanit 7a; Megillah 6a, 26a, 31b–32a, 35b, 39b; Chagigah 6a–b, 14b; Yevamot 10b, 33b–35a, 37a–b, 40a, 41a, 42a, 47a–b, 50b, 51b–52b, 56b, 61a, 65b, 68a; Ketubot 5a, 18a–19a, 20b, 28a, 36a; Nedarim 23b–24a, 40a; Nazir 14a, 22a, 30a, 31a, 36a, 47b; Sotah 10a, 19a–b, 20b, 46b; Gittin 10a; Kiddushin 16b, 21a–b, 22b, 23b; Bava Kamma 2b–3a, 18b, 12a; Bava Batra 27b; Sanhedrin 7a–b, 11a, 12b, 13b, 20b, 25b, 28b, 30a, 33a, 38a, 44b–45a, 55b–56a. Tiberias, Land of Israel, circa 400 CE. In, e.g., Talmud Yerushalmi. Edited by Chaim Malinowitz, Yisroel Simcha Schorr, and Mordechai Marcus, volumes 1–4, 6a–b, 10–15, 18–19, 21–27, 29–31, 33–35, 37–38, 40–41, 43–45. Brooklyn: Mesorah Publications, 2005–2018. And reprinted in, e.g., The Jerusalem Talmud: A Translation and Commentary. Edited by Jacob Neusner and translated by Jacob Neusner, Tzvee Zahavy, B. Barry Levy, and Edward Goldman. Peabody, Massachusetts: Hendrickson Publishers, 2009. .
Genesis Rabbah 16:6; 19:9; 41:1; 48:10; 63:8; 75:13; 76:6; 85:10; 86:3; 91:3; 99:1; 100:2. Land of Israel, 5th century. In, e.g., Midrash Rabbah: Genesis. Translated by Harry Freedman and Maurice Simon, volume 1, pages 131, 156, 332, 412; volume 2, pages 562, 699, 706, 796, 802, 834, 972, 988. London: Soncino Press, 1939. .
Leviticus Rabbah 7:2; 10:3; 24:6; 26:1–32:8. Land of Israel, 5th century. In, e.g., Midrash Rabbah: Leviticus. Translated by Harry Freedman and Maurice Simon, volume 4, pages 92, 124, 309, 325–417. London: Soncino Press, 1939. .

Babylonian Talmud: Shabbat 2a–157b; Eruvin 105a; Pesachim 2a–121b; Rosh Hashanah 2a–35a; Yoma 2a–88a; Sukkah 2a–56b; Megillah 29a; Chagigah 13a, 14b; Mo'ed Katan 14b, 20a–b, 28b; Yevamot 5a, 6a, 15b, 20a–b, 22b, 24a, 37a, 44a, 52a, 55a–b, 56b, 58b–60a, 61a–b, 66a, 69a, 77b, 84a–85b, 86b, 87b, 88b, 89b, 90b–91a, 92a–b, 94a, 99b, 100b, 108a, 114a–b, 120a; Ketubot 14b, 26a, 29b–30a, 36b, 51b, 53a, 70a, 72b, 81a, 89b, 97b–98a, 100b–101b; Nedarim 10b, 62a; Nazir 38a, 40b–41a, 42b–44a, 47b–49a, 52b, 58a–b; Sotah 3a, 6a, 23b, 26b, 29a, 44a; Gittin 24b, 59b–60a, 82b; Kiddushin 10a, 13b, 18b, 35b–36a, 64a, 68a, 72b, 74b, 77a–78a; Bava Kamma 84a, 109b–110a, 114b; Bava Metzia 10b, 18a, 30a; Bava Batra 32a, 160b; Sanhedrin 4a, 5b, 18a–19a, 28b, 46a, 47a, 50a–52a, 53b, 66b, 69b, 76a, 83a–84a; Makkot 2a, 13a, 15a, 16a, 20a, 21a–b; Horayot 9a, 11b, 12b; Zevachim 13a, 15a–16a, 17a, 100a, 101b; Menachot 6a, 109a; Chullin 24a–b, 72a, 134b, 137a; Bekhorot 29a, 43a–45a, 56b; Temurah 5b, 6a, 29b; Keritot 7a; Niddah 8b, 69b. Babylonia, 6th century. In, e.g., Talmud Bavli. Edited by Yisroel Simcha Schorr, Chaim Malinowitz, and Mordechai Marcus, 72 volumes. Brooklyn: Mesorah Pubs., 2006.

Medieval

Saadia Gaon. Emunoth ve-Deoth (The Book of Beliefs and Opinions), treatise 3, chapters 1, 5; treatise 5, chapters 1, 8. Baghdad, Babylonia, 933. In The Book of Beliefs and Opinions. Translated by Samuel Rosenblatt, pages 139, 154, 205, 234. New Haven: Yale University Press, 1948. .
Rashi. Commentary. Leviticus 21–24. Troyes, France, late 11th century. In, e.g., Rashi. The Torah: With Rashi's Commentary Translated, Annotated, and Elucidated. Translated and annotated by Yisrael Isser Zvi Herczeg, volume 3, pages 261–315. Brooklyn: Mesorah Publications, 1994. .

Rashbam. Commentary on the Torah. Troyes, early 12th century. In, e.g., Rashbam's Commentary on Leviticus and Numbers: An Annotated Translation. Edited and translated by Martin I. Lockshin, pages 115–29. Providence: Brown Judaic Studies, 2001. .
Judah Halevi. Kuzari. 2:20, 26, 50; 3:41, 46–47; 5:27. Toledo, Spain, 1130–1140. In, e.g., Jehuda Halevi. Kuzari: An Argument for the Faith of Israel. Introduction by Henry Slonimsky, pages 94, 102, 115, 173, 175, 295. New York: Schocken, 1964. .
Abraham ibn Ezra. Commentary on the Torah. Mid-12th century. In, e.g., Ibn Ezra's Commentary on the Pentateuch: Leviticus (Va-yikra). Translated and annotated by H. Norman Strickman and Arthur M. Silver, volume 3, pages 186–238. New York: Menorah Publishing Company, 2004. .
Maimonides. Mishneh Torah, Structure. Cairo, Egypt, 1170–1180.
Maimonides. Mishneh Torah: Hilchot Yesodei HaTorah (The Laws that Are the Foundations of the Torah), chapter 5. Egypt. Circa 1170–1180. In, e.g., Mishneh Torah: Hilchot Yesodei HaTorah: The Laws [which Are] the Foundations of the Torah. Translated by Eliyahu Touger, volume 1, pages 206–31. New York: Moznaim Publishing, 1989. .

Maimonides. Mishneh Torah: Hilchot Kiddush HaChodesh (The Laws of Sanctification of the New Moon), chapter 2, ¶ 10; chapter 3, ¶ 2. Egypt. Circa 1170–1180. In, e.g., Mishneh Torah: Hilchot Shekalim: The Laws of Shekalim: and Hilchot Kiddush HaChodesh: The Laws of Sanctification of the New Moon. Translated by Eliyahu Touger, volume 14, pages 72–75. New York: Moznaim Publishing, 1993.
Maimonides. Mishneh Torah: Hilchot Terumot (The Laws of Terumot (Priestly Offerings)), chapter 6, ¶ 5. Egypt. Circa 1170–1180. In, e.g., Mishneh Torah: Sefer Zeraim: The Book of Agricultural Ordinances. Translated by Eliyahu Touger, pages 270–73. New York: Moznaim Publishing, 2005. .
Maimonides. Mishneh Torah: Hilchot Temidin uMusafim (The Laws of Continual and Additional Offerings), chapter 7, ¶¶ 5, 11, 13, 22. Egypt. Circa 1170–1180. In, e.g., Mishneh Torah: Sefer Ha'Avodah: The Book of (Temple) Service. Translated by Eliyahu Touger, pages 580–89. New York: Moznaim Publishing, 2007. .

Maimonides. The Guide for the Perplexed, part 1, chapter 64; part 3, chapters 17, 41, 43, 46, 47, 48, 49. Cairo, Egypt, 1190. In, e.g., Moses Maimonides. The Guide for the Perplexed. Translated by Michael Friedländer, pages 96, 287, 344, 346, 353, 360, 369, 371, 379. New York: Dover Publications, 1956. .
Bahir, part 1, paragraph 105. Provence, circa 1174. In, e.g., The Bahir: A Translation and Commentary. Translation and commentary by Aryeh Kaplan, pages 39–40. Lanham, Maryland: Jason Aronson, 1977. .
Hezekiah ben Manoah. Hizkuni. France, circa 1240. In, e.g., Chizkiyahu ben Manoach. Chizkuni: Torah Commentary. Translated and annotated by Eliyahu Munk, volume 3, pages 781–817. Jerusalem: Ktav Publishers, 2013. .
Nachmanides. Commentary on the Torah. Jerusalem, circa 1270. In, e.g., Ramban (Nachmanides): Commentary on the Torah. Translated by Charles B. Chavel, volume 3, pages 326–408. New York: Shilo Publishing House, 1974. .

Zohar part 1, pages 65a, 112a, 166b, 181a; part 2, pages 39b, 40b, 95a, 101a, 108b, 121b, 129b, 133a, 153b, 183a–b, 215a, 216b, 231a, 237a; part 3, pages 7a, 67a, 69b, 73b, 88a–107b. Spain, late 13th century. In, e.g., The Zohar. Translated by Harry Sperling and Maurice Simon. 5 volumes. London: Soncino Press, 1934.
Bahya ben Asher. Commentary on the Torah. Spain, early 14th century. In, e.g., Midrash Rabbeinu Bachya: Torah Commentary by Rabbi Bachya ben Asher. Translated and annotated by Eliyahu Munk, volume 5, pages 1766–821. Jerusalem: Lambda Publishers, 2003. .
Jacob ben Asher (Baal Ha-Turim). Rimze Ba'al ha-Turim. Early 14th century. In, e.g., Baal Haturim Chumash: Vayikra/Leviticus. Translated by Eliyahu Touger, edited, elucidated, and annotated by Avie Gold, volume 3, pages 1221–69. Brooklyn: Mesorah Publications, 2000. .
Jacob ben Asher. Perush Al ha-Torah. Early 14th century. In, e.g., Yaakov ben Asher. Tur on the Torah. Translated and annotated by Eliyahu Munk, volume 3, pages 933–68. Jerusalem: Lambda Publishers, 2005. .
Isaac ben Moses Arama. Akedat Yizhak (The Binding of Isaac). Late 15th century. In, e.g., Yitzchak Arama. Akeydat Yitzchak: Commentary of Rabbi Yitzchak Arama on the Torah. Translated and condensed by Eliyahu Munk, volume 2, pages 633–69. New York, Lambda Publishers, 2001. .

Modern
Isaac Abravanel. Commentary on the Torah. Italy, between 1492–1509. In, e.g., Abarbanel: Selected Commentaries on the Torah: Volume 3: Vayikra/Leviticus. Translated and annotated by Israel Lazar, pages 192–229. Brooklyn: CreateSpace, 2015. .
Obadiah ben Jacob Sforno. Commentary on the Torah. Venice, 1567. In, e.g., Sforno: Commentary on the Torah. Translation and explanatory notes by Raphael Pelcovitz, pages 590–613. Brooklyn: Mesorah Publications, 1997. .
Moshe Alshich. Commentary on the Torah. Safed, circa 1593. In, e.g., Moshe Alshich. Midrash of Rabbi Moshe Alshich on the Torah. Translated and annotated by Eliyahu Munk, volume 2, pages 718–50. New York, Lambda Publishers, 2000. .
Avraham Yehoshua Heschel. Commentaries on the Torah. Cracow, Poland, mid 17th century. Compiled as Chanukat HaTorah. Edited by Chanoch Henoch Erzohn. Piotrkow, Poland, 1900. In Avraham Yehoshua Heschel. Chanukas HaTorah: Mystical Insights of Rav Avraham Yehoshua Heschel on Chumash. Translated by Avraham Peretz Friedman, pages 236–37. Southfield, Michigan: Targum Press/Feldheim Publishers, 2004. .

Thomas Hobbes. Leviathan, 3:40, 42. England, 1651. Reprint edited by C. B. Macpherson, pages 503–04, 572. Harmondsworth, England: Penguin Classics, 1982. .
Shabbethai Bass. Sifsei Chachamim. Amsterdam, 1680. In, e.g., Sefer Vayikro: From the Five Books of the Torah: Chumash: Targum Okelos: Rashi: Sifsei Chachamim: Yalkut: Haftaros, translated by Avrohom Y. Davis, pages 402–82. Lakewood Township, New Jersey: Metsudah Publications, 2012.
Chaim ibn Attar. Ohr ha-Chaim. Venice, 1742. In Chayim ben Attar. Or Hachayim: Commentary on the Torah. Translated by Eliyahu Munk, volume 3, pages 1236–71. Brooklyn: Lambda Publishers, 1999. .

Nachman of Breslov. Teachings. Bratslav, Ukraine, before 1811. In Rebbe Nachman's Torah: Breslov Insights into the Weekly Torah Reading: Exodus-Leviticus. Compiled by Chaim Kramer, edited by Y. Hall, pages 388–418. Jerusalem: Breslov Research Institute, 2011. .
Samuel David Luzzatto (Shadal). Commentary on the Torah. Padua, 1871. In, e.g., Samuel David Luzzatto. Torah Commentary. Translated and annotated by Eliyahu Munk, volume 3, pages 974–83. New York: Lambda Publishers, 2012. .
Samson Raphael Hirsch. The Jewish Sabbath. Frankfurt, before 1889. Translated by Ben Josephussoro. 1911. Reprinted Lexington, Kentucky: CreateSpace Independent Publishing Platform, 2014. .
Yehudah Aryeh Leib Alter. Sefat Emet. Góra Kalwaria (Ger), Poland, before 1906. Excerpted in The Language of Truth: The Torah Commentary of Sefat Emet. Translated and interpreted by Arthur Green, pages 193–200. Philadelphia: Jewish Publication Society, 1998. . Reprinted 2012. .

Louis Ginzberg. Legends of the Jews, volume 3, pages 238–42. Philadelphia: Jewish Publication Society, 1911.
Hermann Cohen. Religion of Reason: Out of the Sources of Judaism. Translated with an introduction by Simon Kaplan; introductory essays by Leo Strauss, pages 103, 110, 125. New York: Ungar, 1972. Reprinted Atlanta: Scholars Press, 1995. . Originally published as Religion der Vernunft aus den Quellen des Judentums. Leipzig: Gustav Fock, 1919.
Alexander Alan Steinbach. Sabbath Queen: Fifty-four Bible Talks to the Young Based on Each Portion of the Pentateuch, pages 96–99. New York: Behrman's Jewish Book House, 1936.

Thomas Mann. Joseph and His Brothers. Translated by John E. Woods, pages 131–32. New York: Alfred A. Knopf, 2005. . Originally published as Joseph und seine Brüder. Stockholm: Bermann-Fischer Verlag, 1943.
The Sabbath Anthology. Edited by Abraham E. Millgram. Philadelphia: The Jewish Publication Society, 1944; reprinted 2018..

Morris Adler, Jacob B. Agus, and Theodore Friedman. "Responsum on the Sabbath." Proceedings of the Rabbinical Assembly, volume 14 (1950), pages 112–88. New York: Rabbinical Assembly of America, 1951. In Proceedings of the Committee on Jewish Law and Standards of the Conservative Movement 1927–1970, volume 3 (Responsa), pages 1109–34. Jerusalem: The Rabbinical Assembly and The Institute of Applied Hallakhah, 1997.
Abraham Joshua Heschel. The Sabbath. New York: Farrar, Straus and Giroux, 1951. Reprinted 2005. .
Morris Adler. The World of the Talmud, page 30. B'nai B'rith Hillel Foundations, 1958. Reprinted Kessinger Publishing, 2007. .

Electric Prunes. "Kol Nidre." In Release of an Oath. Reprise Records, 1968. (track based on the Yom Kippur Kol Nidre prayer).
Carol L. Meyers. The Tabernacle Menorah. Missoula, Montana: Scholars Press, 1976.
Gordon J. Wenham. The Book of Leviticus, pages 288–313. Grand Rapids, Michigan: William B. Eerdmans Publishing Company, 1979. . 
Pinchas H. Peli. Torah Today: A Renewed Encounter with Scripture, pages 143–46. Washington, D.C.: B'nai B'rith Books, 1987. .
Mark S. Smith. The Early History of God: Yahweh and the Other Deities in Ancient Israel, pages 2, 100, 129. New York: HarperSanFrancisco, 1990. .
Harvey J. Fields. A Torah Commentary for Our Times: Volume II: Exodus and Leviticus, pages 138–49. New York: UAHC Press, 1991. .
Walter C. Kaiser Jr., " The Book of Leviticus," in The New Interpreter's Bible, volume 1, pages 1144–66. Nashville: Abingdon Press, 1994. .
Judith S. Antonelli. "The Kohenet." In In the Image of God: A Feminist Commentary on the Torah, pages 313–21. Northvale, New Jersey: Jason Aronson, 1995. .
Ellen Frankel. The Five Books of Miriam: A Woman's Commentary on the Torah, pages 184–87. New York: G. P. Putnam's Sons, 1996. .
Marc Gellman. "Three Green Things and a Yellow." In God's Mailbox: More Stories About Stories in the Bible, pages 85–89. New York: Morrow Junior Books, 1996. .
Jacob Milgrom. "Lex Talionis and the Rabbis: The Talmud reflects an uneasy rabbinic conscience toward the ancient law of talion, 'eye for eye, tooth for tooth.'" Bible Review. Volume 12 (number 2) (April 1996).

W. Gunther Plaut. The Haftarah Commentary, pages 299–307. New York: UAHC Press, 1996. .
Robert Goodman. Teaching Jewish Holidays: History, Values, and Activities. Denver: A.R.E. Publishing, 1997. .
Sorel Goldberg Loeb and Barbara Binder Kadden. Teaching Torah: A Treasury of Insights and Activities, pages 207–13. Denver: A.R.E. Publishing, 1997. .
Susan Freeman. Teaching Jewish Virtues: Sacred Sources and Arts Activities, pages 269–82. Springfield, New Jersey: A.R.E. Publishing, 1999. ..
Frank H. Gorman Jr. "Leviticus." In The HarperCollins Bible Commentary. Edited by James L. Mays, pages 161–63. New York: HarperCollins Publishers, revised edition, 2000. .
Valerie Lieber. "Elitism in the Levitical Priesthood." In The Women's Torah Commentary: New Insights from Women Rabbis on the 54 Weekly Torah Portions. Edited by Elyse Goldstein, pages 231–37. Woodstock, Vermont: Jewish Lights Publishing, 2000. .
Jacob Milgrom. Leviticus 17–22, volume 3A, pages 1791–1892. New York: Anchor Bible, 2000. .
Jacob Milgrom. Leviticus 23–27, volume 3B, pages 1947–2145. New York: Anchor Bible, 2000. .
Lainie Blum Cogan and Judy Weiss. Teaching Haftarah: Background, Insights, and Strategies, pages 489–97. Denver: A.R.E. Publishing, 2002. .
Michael Fishbane. The JPS Bible Commentary: Haftarot, pages 192–97. Philadelphia: Jewish Publication Society, 2002. .
Joseph Telushkin. The Ten Commandments of Character: Essential Advice for Living an Honorable, Ethical, Honest Life, pages 275–78. New York: Bell Tower, 2003. .
Robert Alter. The Five Books of Moses: A Translation with Commentary, pages 635–52. New York: W.W. Norton & Co., 2004. .
Rachel Esserman. "Haftarat Emor: Ezekiel 44:15–31." In The Women's Haftarah Commentary: New Insights from Women Rabbis on the 54 Weekly Haftarah Portions, the 5 Megillot & Special Shabbatot. Edited by Elyse Goldstein, pages 141–45. Woodstock, Vermont: Jewish Lights Publishing, 2004. .
Jacob Milgrom. Leviticus: A Book of Ritual and Ethics: A Continental Commentary, pages 260–97. Minneapolis: Fortress Press, 2004. .
Baruch J. Schwartz. "Leviticus." In The Jewish Study Bible. Edited by Adele Berlin and Marc Zvi Brettler, pages 258–69. New York: Oxford University Press, 2004. .
Antony Cothey. "Ethics and Holiness in the Theology of Leviticus." Journal for the Study of the Old Testament, volume 30 (number 2) (December 2005): pages 131–51.
Professors on the Parashah: Studies on the Weekly Torah Reading Edited by Leib Moscovitz, pages 204–15. Jerusalem: Urim Publications, 2005. .
Judith Z. Abrams. "Misconceptions About Disabilities in the Hebrew Bible." In Jewish Perspectives on Theology and the Human Experience of Disability. Edited by Judith Z. Abrams & William C. Gaventa, pages 73–84. Binghamton, New York: Haworth Pastoral Press, 2006. .
Bernard J. Bamberger. "Leviticus." In The Torah: A Modern Commentary: Revised Edition. Edited by W. Gunther Plaut; revised edition edited by David E.S. Stern, pages 817–47. New York: Union for Reform Judaism, 2006. .
Calum Carmichael. Illuminating Leviticus: A Study of Its Laws and Institutions in the Light of Biblical Narratives. Baltimore: Johns Hopkins University Press, 2006. .
Suzanne A. Brody. "Momentous experiences" and "Blind Interpretations." In Dancing in the White Spaces: The Yearly Torah Cycle and More Poems, pages 21, 91. Shelbyville, Kentucky: Wasteland Press, 2007. .

James L. Kugel. How To Read the Bible: A Guide to Scripture, Then and Now, pages 268, 291, 302, 318, 321, 323–25, 609. New York: Free Press, 2007. .
Christophe Nihan. From Priestly Torah to Pentateuch: A Study in the Composition of the Book of Leviticus. Coronet Books, 2007. .
Saul M. Olyan. Disability in the Hebrew Bible: Interpreting Mental and Physical Differences. Cambridge University Press, 2008. .
The Torah: A Women's Commentary. Edited by Tamara Cohn Eskenazi and Andrea L. Weiss, pages 723–46. New York: URJ Press, 2008. .
Roy E. Gane. "Leviticus." In Zondervan Illustrated Bible Backgrounds Commentary. Edited by John H. Walton, volume 1, pages 317–22. Grand Rapids, Michigan: Zondervan, 2009. .
Reuven Hammer. Entering Torah: Prefaces to the Weekly Torah Portion, pages 179–84. New York: Gefen Publishing House, 2009. .
Joshua Lesser. "Fear Factor: Lesbian Sex and Gay Men: Parashat Emor (Leviticus 21:1–24:23)." In Torah Queeries: Weekly Commentaries on the Hebrew Bible. Edited by Gregg Drinkwater, Joshua Lesser, and David Shneer; foreword by Judith Plaskow, pages 170–73. New York: New York University Press, 2009. .
Leigh M. Trevaskis. "The Purpose of Leviticus 24 within its Literary Context." Vetus Testamentum, volume 59 (number 2) (2009): pages 295–312.
Stuart Lasine. "Everything Belongs to Me: Holiness, Danger, and Divine Kingship in the Post-Genesis World." Journal for the Study of the Old Testament, volume 35 (number 1) (September 2010): pages 31–62.
Jay Michaelson. "Are Corporations Evil?" In The Forward. (August 6, 2010). (a proposal for requiring corporate public charity).
Jeffrey Stackert. "Leviticus." In The New Oxford Annotated Bible: New Revised Standard Version with the Apocrypha: An Ecumenical Study Bible. Edited by Michael D. Coogan, Marc Z. Brettler, Carol A. Newsom, and Pheme Perkins, pages 173–78. New York: Oxford University Press, Revised 4th Edition 2010. .
Joe Lieberman and David Klinghoffer. The Gift of Rest: Rediscovering the Beauty of the Sabbath. New York: Howard Books, 2011. .

Shmuel Herzfeld. "The National Synagogue: The Power of a Name." In Fifty-Four Pick Up: Fifteen-Minute Inspirational Torah Lessons, pages 175–78. Jerusalem: Gefen Publishing House, 2012. .
Daniel S. Nevins. "The Use of Electrical and Electronic Devices on Shabbat." New York: Rabbinical Assembly, 2012.
Adam Kirsch. "Ancient Laws for Modern Times: When is a tent just a tent and not like a bed or a hat? To update Jewish laws, the rabbis reasoned by analogy." Tablet Magazine. (February 26, 2013). (Shabbat).
Adam Kirsch. "Leave the Jewish People Alone: Rabbis left enforcement of their Talmudic decrees to communal standards and voluntary commitment." Tablet Magazine. (March 5, 2013). (Shabbat).
Adam Kirsch. "Written in the Stars (Or Not): To overcome fated lives, the Talmud's rabbis argued, perform virtuous acts according to Torah." Tablet Magazine. (March 12, 2013). (Shabbat).
Adam Kirsch. "Navigating the Talmud's Alleys: The range of problems and the variety of answers in the study of Oral Law lead to new pathways of reasoning." Tablet Magazine. (March 18, 2013). (Shabbat).
Amiel Ungar. "Tel Aviv and the Sabbath." The Jerusalem Report. Volume 24 (number 8) (July 29, 2013): page 37.
Eve Levavi Feinstein. "Priestly Marriage Restrictions." In Sexual Pollution in the Hebrew Bible, pages 91–98. New York: Oxford University Press, 2014.
Bernon Lee. "Unity in Diversity: The Literary Function of the Formula of Retaliation in Leviticus 24.15–22." Journal for the Study of the Old Testament, volume 38 (number 3) (March 2014): pages 297–313.
Amanda Terkel. "Glenn Grothman, Wisconsin GOP Senator, Fights for a Seven-Day Workweek." The Huffington Post. (January 3, 2014, updated January 23, 2014). (Congressional candidate said, "Right now in Wisconsin, you're not supposed to work seven days in a row, which is a little ridiculous because all sorts of people want to work seven days a week.")
Ester Bloom. "The Crazy New App For Using Your iPhone on Shabbos."  Jewniverse. (October 1, 2014).
Zachary Schrieber. "What Is Shemini Atzeret, Anyway? We ask the experts about the High Holiday season's least-understood festival." Tablet Magazine. (October 15, 2014).
Art Swift. "Americans: 'Eye for an Eye' Top Reason for Death Penalty." Gallup. (October 23, 2014).
"The Crazy New Invention for Using Electricity on Shabbat."  Jewniverse. (April 21, 2015).

Jonathan Sacks. Covenant & Conversation: A Weekly Reading of the Jewish Bible: Leviticus: The Book of Holiness, pages 315–58. Jerusalem: Maggid Books, 2015. .
Jonathan Sacks. Lessons in Leadership: A Weekly Reading of the Jewish Bible, pages 165–67. New Milford, Connecticut: Maggid Books, 2015. .
Jonathan Sacks. Essays on Ethics: A Weekly Reading of the Jewish Bible, pages 195–99. New Milford, Connecticut: Maggid Books, 2016. .
Shai Held. The Heart of Torah, Volume 2: Essays on the Weekly Torah Portion: Leviticus, Numbers, and Deuteronomy, pages 66–75. Philadelphia: Jewish Publication Society, 2017. .
Steven Levy and Sarah Levy. The JPS Rashi Discussion Torah Commentary, pages 100–02. Philadelphia: Jewish Publication Society, 2017. .

External links

Texts
Masoretic text and 1917 JPS translation
Hear the parashah chanted
Hear the parashah read in Hebrew

Commentaries

Academy for Jewish Religion, California
Academy for Jewish Religion, New York
Aish.com 
Akhlah: The Jewish Children's Learning Network
Aleph Beta Academy
American Jewish University — Ziegler School of Rabbinic Studies
Anshe Emes Synagogue, Los Angeles 
Ari Goldwag
Ascent of Safed
Bar-Ilan University 
Chabad.org
eparsha.com
G-dcast
The Israel Koschitzky Virtual Beit Midrash
Jewish Agency for Israel
Jewish Theological Seminary
Kabbala Online
LearningTorah.org
Mechon Hadar
Miriam Aflalo
MyJewishLearning.com
Ohr Sameach
Orthodox Union
OzTorah, Torah from Australia
Oz Ve Shalom — Netivot Shalom
Pardes from Jerusalem
Professor James L. Kugel
Professor Michael Carasik
Rabbi Dov Linzer
Rabbi Fabian Werbin
Rabbi Jonathan Sacks
RabbiShimon.com 
Rabbi Shlomo Riskin
Rabbi Shmuel Herzfeld
Rabbi Stan Levin 
Reconstructionist Judaism 
Sephardic Institute
Shiur.com
613.org Jewish Torah Audio
Tanach Study Center
TheTorah.com
Torah from Dixie 
Torah.org
TorahVort
Union for Reform Judaism
United Synagogue of Conservative Judaism
What's Bothering Rashi?
Yeshivat Chovevei Torah
Yeshiva University

Weekly Torah readings in Iyar
Weekly Torah readings from Leviticus